Videogame Nation may refer to:
 Videogame Nation (TV programme)
 Videogame Nation (exhibition)